DeJuan Wright (born December 7, 1988) is an American professional basketball player for Kutaisi 2010 of the Georgian Superliga. Wright usually plays the shooting guard position.

From Detroit, Wright attended Henry Ford High School and Florida International University.

Career
In the 2012-2013 season, Wright played for EiffelTowers Den Bosch in the Netherlands. On September 27, 2013 Wright signed with BC Orchies in the LNB Pro B, the second league in France. He averaged 14.3 points and 5 rebounds for Orchies. Wright returned to the Netherlands on January 31, 2014 when he signed with Zorg en Zekerheid Leiden.

For the 2014–15 season Wright signed in the Netherlands again, this time for Donar from Groningen. On 12 March 2015, Wright was ruled out for the season after he tore his achilles. He averaged 15.5 points per game till his injury.
 
In October 2015, he signed in Austria with WBC Raiffeisen Wels.

In the summer of 2017, Wright signed with BC Kutaisi 2010 in Georgia. Since then, he has won two Georgian Cups and one Gerogian Supercup with team.

Honors

Club
EiffelTowers Den Bosch
NBB Cup (1): 2012–13
Donar
NBB Cup (1): 2014–15
Dutch Supercup (1): 2014
Kutaisi 2010
Georgian Cup (2): 2017–18, 2020–21
Georgian Supercup: 2018

Individual
DBL All-Star (1): 2013
 DBL Dunk contest winner (1): 2013

References

External links
Austrian ÖBL profile

1988 births
Living people
American expatriate basketball people in Austria
American expatriate basketball people in France
American expatriate basketball people in Georgia (country)
American expatriate basketball people in the Netherlands
American men's basketball players
BC Orchies players
B.S. Leiden players
Basketball players from Detroit
Heroes Den Bosch players
Donar (basketball club) players
Dutch Basketball League players
Ferris State Bulldogs men's basketball players
FIU Panthers men's basketball players
Flyers Wels players
Henry Ford High School (Detroit, Michigan) alumni
Junior college men's basketball players in the United States
Shooting guards